Reyna Grande (born 7 September 1975, Iguala, Guerrero, Mexico) is a Mexican-American author.

Biography 
Grande grew up in poverty with her two siblings in Iguala, Guerrero. When she was under five years old, her father moved to the U.S. to earn money to build a house in Iguala but wasn't successful.  He called for Grande’s mother, who left Grande and her siblings with their paternal grandmother. Her father later returned to take her eldest sibling to the United States, but Grande and her other siblings wanted to go as well. Thus, Grande traveled to the U.S. as an undocumented child immigrant via an illegal border crossing at the age of about 9. She went on to become the first in her family to obtain a college degree.

Grande attended Pasadena City College and later transferred to University of California, Santa Cruz, where she obtained a B.A. degree in literature/creative writing. She later received her M.F.A. in creative writing from Antioch University. She has been honored with an American Book Award, the El Premio Aztlan Literary Award, and most recently, the Luis Leal Award for Distinction in Chicano/Latino Literature.

Grande is a member of the prestigious Macondo Writers Workshop, the workshop founded by Sandra Cisneros. She has taught creative writing at UCLA Extension's Writer's Program, at VONA (Voices of Our Nation's Arts), the Latino Writer's Conference, and more.

Work 
Grande's first novel, Across a Hundred Mountains. draws heavily on her own experiences growing up in Mexico and as an undocumented immigrant in the U.S. The book was selected by a number of common read programs.

Grande's second novel, Dancing with Butterflies (Washington Square Press, 2009), was published to critical acclaim. An excerpt of Dancing with Butterflies was published in 2008 as a short story, titled "Adriana," in Latinos in Lotusland: An Anthology of Contemporary Southern California Literature (Bilingual Press), edited by Daniel Olivas.

In 2012, Atria Books published Grande's memoir, The Distance Between Us, a novel about the true and raw difficulties that migrants face when going to a new country without being able to understand the language. It is described as, a coming-of-age story about her life before and after coming to the U.S. as an undocumented child immigrant. In an interview published by the Los Angeles Review of Books on 6 December 2012, Grande explained why she decided to part from fiction to tell her story:

The Distance Between Us was a finalist for the National Book Critics Circle Award (autobiography category). In 2016, Aladdin, a division of Simon and Schuster, republished the memoir as a young readers adaptation for ages 10-14. As with Across a Hundred Mountains, The Distance Between Us has been selected for a number of common read programs such as the 2018 Keker First Year Common Read at UNC Greensboro, 
Rochester Reads 2018, 
MacReads 2018 at Linfield College, the 
One Book/One Michiana 2018, 
All Henrico Reads 2018, 
Notre Dame Academy Common Reader 2017, the CityRead Book 2017 in Brentwood, CA, 
Timberland Reads Together 2017 in Washington, the 
2017 One Book, One Canyon in Telluride, CO, the 
2017 Estes Park One Book, One Valley, the 
2017 Cal Poly Pomona Common Read, the 
2017 Northern Kentucky University First Year Experience, the 
2017 Avila University First Year Experience, the 
2017 Marist College Common Read, the 
2017 Cal State University, Monterey Bay Common Reading Experience, the 
2016 One Book/One Community in Saginaw, MI, the 2016 Colorado Mountain College Common Reader Selection, the 
2016 Camarillo Reads Selection in Camarillo, CA, the 2015 One Book/One Villanova at Villanova University, PA, the 2015 Sandy Springs Reads selection in Sandy Springs, GA, the 2015 Los Angeles City College Book Program Selection, CA, the 2015 Mount San Jacinto College Common Read Selection, the
2015 Read 2 Succeed Selection at Norco College, the 2015 Roswell Reads Selection in Roswell, GA, 
2015 One Book/One Leyden selection at Leyden High School, IL, the 2014 One Maryland, One Book, the 
2014 One Community, One Book selection from the U of Iowa Center for Human Rights, the 
2014 Santa Rosa Junior College Reads, the 2014 One Book, One Community at San Juan College, the 2014 Rolling Meadows High School Summer Reading Program, the 
2014-15 “Book in Common” at Butte College/Chico State University, the 
Grand Valley State University 2013 “Common Reading” selection, the 
California State University-Los Angeles “First Year Experience” Selection, the 2014 Goshen College, “First Year Experience” Selection.

In October 2018, the much-anticipated sequel, A Dream Called Home, was released by Atria, earning a starred review from Publishers Weekly. “This uplifting story of fortitude and resilience looks deeply into the complexities of immigration and one woman’s struggle to adapt and thrive in America." People Magazine said of the book, “The emotional and practical challenges for a young immigrant are on full display in Grande’ s evocative, inspiring memoir.”

Awards 
 2006 Premio Aztlán Literary Award — for Across a Hundred Mountains 
 2007 American Book Award — for Across a Hundred Mountains
 2010 International Book Award — for Dancing with Butterflies
 2012 Finalist for the National Book Critics Circle Award - for The Distance Between Us 
 2015 Luis Leal Award for Distinction in Chicano/Latino Literature
 2016 Eureka! Honor Awards from the California Reading Association--for The Distance Between Us, young readers edition
 2017 Honor Book Award for the Américas Award for Children’s and Young Adult Literature - for The Distance Between Us, young readers edition
 International Literacy Association Children’s Book Award 2017 - for The Distance Between Us, young readers version

Bibliography 
 Across a Hundred Mountains (Atria, 2006) — selected:
 2007 Eastern Connecticut "One Book/One Region"
 2010 Watsonville, California On the Same Page 
 2012 Owensboro Community & Technical College Common Read
 2013-14 Ramona Convent Secondary School "One School/One Community"
 2016 Woodland Reads selection, Woodland, CA
 Dancing with Butterflies (Washington Square Press, 2009)
 The Distance Between Us (Atria Books, 2012) —  selected: 
 2013 Grand Valley State University "Community Read"
 2014 One Maryland, One Book
 2014 University of Iowa Center for Human Rights One Community, One Book
 2014 Santa Rosa Junior College Reads
 2014 San Juan College One Book, One Community
 2014 Rolling Meadows High School Summer Reading Program
 2014 California State University, Los Angeles "First Year Experience"
 2014 Goshen College "First Year Experience" Selection
 2014 Monroe County, Michigan's One Book/One Community
 2014-15 Butte College "Book in Common" 
 2014-15 Chico State University "Book in Common"
 2015 Sandy Springs Reads Sandy Springs, GA
 2016 Camarillo Reads Camarillo, CA
 2016 Colorado Mountain College Common Reader Selection
 2016 One Book/One Community, Saginaw, MI
 2017 Cal Poly Pomona "First Year Experience" Common Read
 Notre Dame Academy Common Reader 2017,KY
CityRead Book 2017, Brentwood, CA
 Timberland Reads Together 2017, WA,
 2017 One Book, One Canyon, Telluride, CO,+
 2017 Estes Park One Book, One Valley
 2017 Northern Kentucky University First Year Experience
 2017 Avila University First Year Experience
 2017 Marist College Common Read
 2017 Cal State University, Monterey Bay Common Reading Experience
 2018 Keker First Year Common Read, UNC Greensboro
 Rochester Reads 2018
 MacReads 2018 at Linfield College
 One Book/One Michiana 2018
 All Henrico Reads 2018
A Dream Called Home: A Memoir, (Simon and Schuster, 2018) 
2018 Santa Rosa Junior College - Required reading for Hist 21.

References

External links

 Author's website
 Daniel Olivas interviews Reyna Grande

American women novelists
Mexican women novelists
Hispanic and Latino American novelists
21st-century American novelists
21st-century American women writers
1975 births
Living people
Antioch University
Writers from Guerrero
People from Iguala
Mexican emigrants to the United States

American Book Award winners
American writers of Mexican descent
Undocumented immigrants to the United States